WNEB (1230 AM) is a Catholic radio station broadcasting religious programming. Licensed to Worcester, Massachusetts, United States, the station serves the Worcester area.  The station is owned by Emmanuel Communications, Inc. and features EWTN programming.

History
WNEB signed on December 16, 1946 under the ownership of the New England Broadcasting Company.  It was Worcester's fourth radio station (after WTAG, WORC, and WAAB), and its first independent station.  New England Broadcasting, owned by John Hurley, sold the station to George Steffy and Harold Glidden in 1960; around this time, WNEB had a middle of the road (MOR) format.  Its independent status ended in 1963, when the station joined the CBS Radio Network.

Glidden took full control of WNEB in 1975, shortly after Steffy's death; soon afterward, the station shifted to a country music format.  The CBS affiliation had also ceased by this time, and moved to WAAB.  Two years later, WNEB was sold to Segal Broadcasting.  Segal reverted the station to MOR and affiliated it with the ABC Entertainment network.  WNEB shifted to a big band format in 1981; the next year, it rejoined CBS.  AAMAR Communications bought the station in 1986.  Financial problems soon forced AAMAR to file for Chapter 11 bankruptcy protection on December 4, 1990; on August 23, 1991, WNEB went dark.

Bob Bittner, owner of WJIB in Cambridge, purchased WNEB in 1994, and brought the station back on the air October 24, 1996 with a simulcast of WJIB's beautiful music format.  A year later, Bittner sold the station to Heirwaves, Inc., which relaunched the station with a contemporary Christian music format on November 29, 1997.  Heirwaves sold WNEB to Great Commission Broadcasting in 1999, which implemented a simulcast of similarly-formatted WJLT from Natick (which Great Commission programmed at that time) soon afterward.  Great Commission later changed its name to Grace Broadcasting.

A financial dispute with Windsor Financial Corporation led to Windsor assuming control of WNEB's license in 2003.  The station's format and staff then migrated to WYCM (90.1 FM) (its station manager, Stephen Binley, had founded Heirwaves and remained with WNEB after the sale to Great Commission), and Windsor operated WNEB with an automated contemporary Christian music format for several months before switching it to a simulcast of Leicester's WVNE (760 AM), a religious station owned by Blount Communications, that fall; as WVNE is a daytimer, WNEB continued the format on its own during that station's off-air hours.  Blount bought WNEB outright soon afterward.

WNEB began moving away from religious programming in June 2007 with the addition of The Sean Hannity Show; in March 2008, it switched to a full-time conservative talk format.  This format ended in April 2009, and the station went silent for one week before the launch of a Spanish language talk format, also incorporating some inspirational music, on May 4.

Blount sold WNEB to Emmanuel Communications, with plans to relaunch the station with Catholic radio programming, in October 2010.  Upon taking over on January 14, 2011, WNEB temporarily left the air once more while relocating to new studios; it returned to the air with the new format on May 1.  As with most Catholic radio stations, WNEB is an EWTN Radio affiliate, though it intends to produce some local programming as well.

References

External links
FCC History Cards for WNEB

Catholic radio stations
Radio stations established in 1946
NEB
1946 establishments in Massachusetts
NEB
Catholic Church in Massachusetts